Vatomandry is a district located in Atsinanana Region, Madagascar.

Etymology and location 
Located on the coast, the town's name means 'Sleeping Rocks', derived from two black rocks near the shore. It is also on the path of the Canal des Pangalanes and Route Nationale (RN) 11.

History 
In the pre-colonial era of the 19th century, Vatomandry was a center of Hova government with an active port.

Cyclone Manou caused great damage in 2003 to the town and left 68 people dead. Cyclone Giovanna in 2012 also caused significant damage.

Religion
 Roman Catholic Apostolic Prefecture of Vatomandry

Notable personalities 
 Didier Ratsiraka (1936-2021), former President of Madagascar

Communes
The district is further divided into 14 communes:

 Ambalavolo
 Amboditavolo
 Ambodivoananto
 Ampasimadinika
 Antanambao Mahatsara
 Ifasina I
 Ifasina II
 Ilaka Est
 Maintinandry
 Nierenana
 Sahamatevina
 Tanambao Vahatrakaka
 Tsivangiana
 Vatomandry

References 

Populated places in Atsinanana

Districts of Atsinanana